Sita is a 2019 Indian Telugu-language romantic comedy film directed by Teja and produced by Sunkara Ramabrahmam. The film stars Kajal Aggarwal as the titular character along with Bellamkonda Sreenivas and Sonu Sood. The music was composed by Anoop Rubens with cinematography by Sirsha Ray and editing by Kotagiri Venkateswara Rao. The film was released on 24 May 2019 to negative reviews and was a double disaster at the box office.

Plot 

A four-year-old boy named Raghuram is left in a monastery by Anand Mohan and is promised that Sita will come to take care of him. Anand makes Ram promise that he too will take care of Sita in return.

Years later, V. Sita Mahalakshmi is an ambitious and successful, yet arrogant and selfish businesswoman, who manipulates people for her own gain. One day, she meets MLA Basavaraju to help her in evacuating a slum from the land she purchased to build a mall. In return, Basava asks Sita to marry him (though he is already married), which she declines. He then asks her to be in a live-in relationship for a month, to which she agrees and signs a contract. The slum is removed from the land and Sita parties with her staff, where Basava arrives, but she refuses to honor the deal. Irritated by her behavior, Basava starts putting business pressure on Sita by bribing or intimidating the officers into stopping the mall she is working on and threatening the man who gave Rs. 25 crore to Sita for her business development to make her repay the loan immediately.

During this time, Sita learns that her estranged father Anand has passed away, so she plans to inherit ₹5000 crores worth of property owned by him to pay off the loan. The lawyer reveals that Anand left only a mangalsutra in her name, and she is shocked upon knowing that the property was transferred to a person named Ram, who stays in Bhutan. With her friend Chakram and PA Rupa, Sita travels to Bhutan and meets Ram, who is eagerly waiting for her. Ram is very intelligent, but a kid at heart and always remembers the promise that he made to his uncle that he must take care of Sita, and she will take care of him. He always wears two watches in which one shows his heartbeat, wanting everything to be as per the timing. Sita threatens Ram to give her property back, and in a helpless situation, she asks him to come with her without informing the monastery.

A series of funny incidents take place where Ram tries to be honest, which irritates Sita. The police, arranged by Basava, try to arrest Sita for forgery, but she keeps escaping from them with Ram, Chakram, and Rupa. Sita asks Ram to sign the property papers so that the property will be legally accepted by Ram, and then she can ask him to put it back in her name. Sita asks Ram to marry her but has Rupa give her a fake call, which she uses to create a scene that the police are looking for her. Ram signs the papers immediately to save Sita, and she rushes to the bank to withdraw the money, planning to leave Ram behind. However, the bank cannot authorize the transfer without Sita providing legal proof that Ram is her husband. The police find and try to arrest Sita, but Ram saves her again. However, she remains indifferent to him throughout the ordeal, upsetting Chakram and Rupa.

Later, Sita reaches the court with help from Ram, Chakram, Rupa, and some localities to acquire bail. Afterwards, her father's friend and a legal advisor to the family reveals Ram's connection to her: Sita's egoistic mother refused to give her jewelry for mortgage to Anand to help start his business. Anand's sister (Ram's mother) then offered her jewelry, including her mangalsutra, to her brother. When Ram's parents die in an accident, Anand brings Ram into his home, and during this time, his business takes off. Sita's mother celebrates with lavish jewelry for herself and her daughter, but Anand yells that since the business formed because of his sister's financial support, the property rights belong to Ram. Anand reveals that Sita can wear the jewelry as she is Ram's wife. This outrages Sita's mother and she starts abusing Ram, prompting Anand to leave him in the monastery to protect him. Hearing this, Sita decides to repay the jewels given by Ram's mother as a loan.

Meanwhile, Basava's men attack Ram. Sita tries to save him but gets beaten by a goon. Ram fights with all the goons, but Basava shoots him, demanding that Sita must surrender to him to save Ram. Sita eventually agrees to Basava's terms, but when seeing her crying, Ram wakes up and fights with Basava, who shoots him again. Sita and Ram manage to escape and while she is taking Ram to the hospital, he requests Sita to take him to the bank so that he can sign the property papers before he dies. However, Sita finally declares that she needs him and not the property. Basava attacks the car and they are both injured. The monk in the monastery sends one of his disciples to safeguard Ram, and he arrives on time with the ambulance.

Two weeks later, Sita regains consciousness and rushes to see Ram. The monk tells that Ram has died in the accident and scolds Sita over how she treated him. Sita tearfully leaves the monastery, remorseful that she is the one who killed Ram. Ram comes to his room in the monastery and then senses that Sita has arrived rushes to see her (as the monk was lying). Sita also senses that the monk lied to her as no one in the monastery is aware of the incidents that happened in Hyderabad. Later, she reconciles with Ram, and he marries her. Basava is shot by his wife, saving Sita. The movie ends with Sita and Ram distributing the house papers back to the people of the slum.

Cast 

Kajal Aggarwal as V. Sita Mahalakshmi
Bellamkonda Sreenivas as Raghuram
Sonu Sood as MLA Basavaraju
Abhinav Gomatam as Chakram
Mannara Chopra as Rupa
Abhimanyu Singh as Inspector Murari [C.I]
Kota Srinivasa Rao as Basava's father-in-law
Tanikella Bharani as Jayababu
K. Bhagyaraj as Anand Mohan, Sita's father
Sangeeta as Chinta Santhama
Giri Babu as Judge
Amit Behl as Baba
Lalit Parimoo as Lawyer
Rohit Pathak as Lawyer Chakrapani
Raja Ravindra as Psychiatrist
Duvvasi Mohan as Constable
Bithiri Sathi as Sathi
Mahesh Achanta as The Person who lives in slum
Praveen as Bus Conductor in Bhutan
 Rethika Srinivas as Sita's mother
 Meena Kumari as Raghuram's mother
 Abhishek Agarwal as Bank Officer (cameo)
Payal Rajput in a special appearance in the song "Bull Reddy"

Satya muchumari in a special appearance in the song "Bull Reddy"

Soundtrack 

The soundtrack was composed by Anup Rubens and lyrics by Lakshmi Bhupala, Ramajogayya Sastry, and Surendra Krishna.

Dubbed versions 
This film was inspired by Hollywood film released in 1988 named as Rain Man with box office 354.8 Million starring Dustin Hoffman, Tom Cruise, Valeria Golino and Directed by Barry Levinson.
Then in 2019 it was remade in Tollywood and named as Sita.
The film was dubbed and released in Tamil as It's My Life, in Hindi as Sita Ram and in Malayalam as Janaki Nayakan.

Critical reception 
Neeshita Nyayapati of The Times of India gave 2.5 out of 5 starts stating, "A tale of two misfits gone wrong!"

References

External links 
 

2010s Telugu-language films
Indian romantic comedy films
2019 romantic comedy films
2019 masala films